Chiquitano (also Bésɨro or Tarapecosi) is an indigenous language isolate spoken in the central region of Santa Cruz Department of eastern Bolivia and the state of Mato Grosso in Brazil.

Classification
Chiquitano is usually considered to be a language isolate. Joseph Greenberg linked it to the Macro-Jê languages in his proposal, but the results of his study have been later questioned due to methodological flaws.

Kaufman (1994) suggests a relationship with the Bororoan languages. Adelaar (2008) classifies Chiquitano as a Macro-Jê language, while Nikulin (2020) suggests that Chiquitano is rather a sister of Macro-Jê.

Varieties

Mason (1950)
Mason (1950) lists:

Chiquito
North (Chiquito)
Manasí (Manacica)
Penoki (Penokikia)
Pinyoca; Kusikia
Tao; Tabiica
Churapa

Loukotka (1968)

According to Čestmír Loukotka (1968), dialects were Tao (Yúnkarirsh), Piñoco, Penoqui, Kusikia, Manasi, San Simoniano, Churapa.

Tao (Yúnkarirsh) - spoken at the old missions of San Rafael, Santa Ana, San Miguel, San Ignacio, San Juan, Santo Corazón, and Concepción, Bolivia.
Piñoco - spoken at the missions of San Xavier, San José, and San José de Buenaventura.
Penoqui - spoken at the old mission of San José. (However, Combès suggests that Penoqui was a synonym of Gorgotoqui and may have been a Bororoan language.)
Cusiquia - once spoken north of the Penoqui tribe.
Manasi - once spoken at the old missions of San Francisco Xavier and Concepción, Santa Cruz province.
San Simoniano - now spoken in the Sierra de San Simón and the Danubio River.
Churapa - spoken on the Piray River, Santa Cruz province.

Otuke, a Bororoan language, was also spoken in some of the missions.

Nikulin (2020)
Chiquitano varieties listed by Nikulin (2020):

Chiquitano
Bésɨro (also known as Lomeriano Chiquitano), spoken in the Lomerío region and in Concepción, Ñuflo de Chávez Province. Co-official status and has a standard orthography.
Migueleño Chiquitano (in San Miguel de Velasco and surroundings), moribund with fewer than 30 speakers
Eastern
Ignaciano Chiquitano (in San Ignacio de Velasco and surroundings)
Santiagueño Chiquitano (in Santiago de Chiquitos)
Divergent varieties
Sansimoniano (spoken in the far northeast of Beni Department)
Piñoco (formerly spoken in the missions of San José de los Boros, San Francisco Xavier de los Piñoca, and San José de Buenavista/Desposorios; see also Jesuit Missions of Chiquitos)

Nikulin (2019) proposes that Camba Spanish has a Piñoco substratum. Camba Spanish was originally spoken in Santa Cruz Department, Bolivia, but is now also spoken in Beni Department and Pando Department.

Some Chiquitano also prefer to call themselves Monkóka (plural form for 'people'; the singular form for 'person' is Monkóxɨ).

Nikulin also tentatively proposes an Eastern subgroup for the varieties spoken in San Ignacio de Velasco, Santiago de Chiquitos, and Brazil.

In Brazil, Chiquitano is spoken in the municipalities of Cáceres, Porto Esperidião, Pontes e Lacerda, and Vila Bela da Santíssima Trindade in the state of Mato Grosso.

Historical subgroups
The following list of Jesuit and pre-Jesuit-era historical dialect groupings of Chiquitano is from Nikulin (2019), after Matienzo et al. (2011: 427–435) and Hervás y Panduro (1784: 30). The main dialect groups were Tao, Piñoco, and Manasi.

Penoquí (Gorgotoqui?), possibly a Bororoan language, was spoken in San José.

Phonology

Consonants

Vowels

Nasal assimilation 
Chiquitano has regressive assimilation triggered by nasal nuclei  and targeting consonant onsets within a morpheme.
   →  'parrot (sp.)'

Syllable structure 
The language has CV, CVV, and CVC syllables. It does not allow complex onsets or codas. The only codas allowed are nasal consonants.

Vocabulary
Loukotka (1968) lists the following basic vocabulary items for different dialects of Chiquito (Chiquitano).

{| class="wikitable sortable"
! gloss !! Chiquito !! Yúnkarirsh !! San Simoniano !! Churápa
|-
! tooth
| oh-ox ||  || oän || noosh
|-
! tongue
| otús ||  || natä || iyúto
|-
! foot
| popez || popess || pipín || ípiop
|-
! woman
| pais || páirsh || paá || páish
|-
! water
| toʔus || tush ||  || túʔush
|-
! fire
| péz || péesh ||  || peés
|-
! sun
| suur || suursh || sóu || súush
|-
! manioc
| tauax || táhuash || tabá || tawásh
|-
! tapir
| okitapakis || tapakish ||  || oshtápakish
|-
! house
| ogox || póosh ||  || ípiosh
|-
! red
| kiturixi || kéturuk ||  || kéturikí
|}

For a vocabulary list of Chiquitano by Santana (2012), see the Portuguese Wiktionary.

Language contact
Chiquitano has borrowed extensively from an unidentified Tupí-Guaraní variety; one example is Chiquitano takones [takoˈnɛs] ‘sugarcane’, borrowed from a form close to Paraguayan Guaraní takuare'ẽ ‘sugarcane’. There are also numerous Spanish borrowings.

Chiquitano (or an extinct variety close to it) has influenced the Camba variety of Spanish. This is evidenced by the numerous lexical borrowings of Chiquitano origin in local Spanish. Examples include bi ‘genipa’, masi ‘squirrel’, peni ‘lizard’, peta ‘turtle, tortoise’, jachi ‘chicha leftover’, jichi ‘worm; jichi spirit’, among many others.

Further reading
Galeote Tormo, J. (1993). Manitana Auqui Besüro: Gramática Moderna de la lengua Chiquitana y Vocabulario Básico. Santa Cruz de la Sierra: Los Huérfanos.
Santana, A. C. (2005). Transnacionalidade lingüística: a língua Chiquitano no Brasil. Goiânia: Universidade Federal de Goiás. (Masters dissertation).
Nikulin, Andrey. 2019. ¡Manityaka au r-ózura! Diccionario básico del chiquitano migueleño: El habla de San Miguel de Velasco y de San Juan de Lomerío.

References

External links 

 Lenguas de Bolivia (online edition)

Languages of Bolivia
Indigenous languages of South America (Central)
Language isolates of South America
Jesuit Missions of Chiquitos
Mamoré–Guaporé linguistic area